Emerson Reis Luiz (born 4 January 1986), known as just Emerson, is a Brazilian footballer who plays for Yangon United in Myanmar.

Career
Emerson began his career with Guarani FC in 2003,  playing for some clubs such as São Bernardo, Red Bull Brasil and Inter de Bebedouro. He began his international career in 2012 by playing for FAS and then Yangon United in 2014.

On 24 November 2015, Emerson signed a two-year contract with Bosnian Premijer liga side FK Sarajevo, before having his contract terminated by mutual consent on 23 June 2016.

Career statistics

Honours

Team
Red Bull Brasil
Campeonato Paulista Segunda Divisão (1): 2009
Yangon United
Myanmar National League (2): 2015
 Vitória F.C.
Copa Espírito Santo (3): 2018

References

1986 births
Living people
Brazilian footballers
Brazilian expatriate footballers
Guarani FC players
São Bernardo Futebol Clube players
Red Bull Brasil players
Associação Atlética Internacional (Bebedouro) players
C.D. FAS footballers
Yangon United F.C. players
FK Sarajevo players
Vitória Futebol Clube (ES) players
Estrela do Norte Futebol Clube players
Zwegabin United F.C. players
Premier League of Bosnia and Herzegovina players
Association football forwards
Brazilian expatriate sportspeople in Bosnia and Herzegovina
Brazilian expatriate sportspeople in El Salvador
Brazilian expatriate sportspeople in Myanmar
Expatriate footballers in Bosnia and Herzegovina
Expatriate footballers in El Salvador
Expatriate footballers in Myanmar